Fervidobacterium gondwanense is a species of thermophilic anaerobic bacteria. It is non-sporulating, motile, gram-negative, and rod-shaped.

References

Further reading
Ravot, Gilles, et al. "L-Alanine production from glucose fermentation by hyperthermophilic members of the domains Bacteria and Archaea: a remnant of an ancestral metabolism?." Applied and Environmental Microbiology 62.7 (1996): 2657–2659.
Dworkin, Martin, and Stanley Falkow, eds. The Prokaryotes: Vol. 7: Proteobacteria: Delta and Epsilon Subclasses. Deeply Rooting Bacteria. Vol. 7. Springer, 2006.

External links
Type strain of Fervidobacterium gondwanense at BacDive -  the Bacterial Diversity Metadatabase

Thermotogota
Gram-positive bacteria